Shamsul Huda Stadium, also known as Jessore Stadium, is a football and cricket stadium located near municipality park in the Jessore city, Bangladesh. It has become a venue of first class and list A cricket since 2000.

See also
 Stadiums in Bangladesh
 Tangail Stadium
 List of football stadiums in Bangladesh
 List of cricket grounds in Bangladesh

References

Cricket grounds in Bangladesh
Football venues in Bangladesh